Anakles was a 6th-century B.C. Greek vase-painter whose work was closely associated with that of Nikosthenes with whom he may have been in partnership.

See also
 List of Greek vase painters

References

External links
 Walters, H.B. & Birch, S. (1905) History of ancient pottery: Greek, Etruscan, and Roman. Vol. I free download here. Vol. II free download here.

6th-century BC Greek people
Ancient Greek vase painters